The 2008 season in Swedish football, starting January 2008 and ending December 2008:

Events

Honours

Official titles

Competitions

Promotions, relegations and qualifications

Promotions

Relegations

International qualifications

Domestic results

Allsvenskan

2008 Allsvenskan qualification play-off

Superettan

2008 Superettan qualification play-off

2008 Division 1 Norra

2008 Division 1 Södra

2008 Svenska Cupen 

Quarter-finals

Semi-finals

Final

2008 Supercupen 

Final

National team results

Notes

References 
Online

 
Seasons in Swedish football